Dr. Mahmoud El Manhaly (born 1 January 1942) is an Egyptian sugaring plants scientist. El Manhaly was the manager of the Egyptian Research Institute of sugaring plants, and the technical consultant of Dr. Youssef Waly; the Egyptian former minister of Agriculture. He is also a staff member of the Higher Institute of Tourism in Alexandria.

El Manhaly was the first to produce the seeds of sugar beet in Egypt and in Syria.

Early life 
El Manhaly was born on 1 January 1942 in Metoubes, a town in Kafr El Sheikh.

Career
El Manhaly was graduated from faculty of agriculture of Alexandria University in 1964.

References 

1942 births
Living people
Egyptian agriculturalists
People from Kafr El Sheikh Governorate